The Washington State Cougars women's basketball team represents Washington State University in women's basketball. The school competes in the Pac-12 Conference in Division I of the National Collegiate Athletic Association (NCAA). The Cougars play at Beasley Coliseum near the campus in Pullman, Washington.

Season-by-season record
The Cougars have a 533–794 all-time record as of the 2018–19 season, with a 138–402 record in the Pacific 10/12 Conference and a 228–488 overall record for conferences.

Postseason results

NCAA Division I
The Cougars have appeared in four NCAA Tournaments, with a combined record of 0–4.

AIAW Division I
The Cougars made one appearance in the AIAW National Division I basketball tournament, with a combined record of 1–1.

References

External links